The Blind Woman of Sorrento (Italian:La cieca di Sorrento) may refer to:

 The Blind Woman of Sorrento (novel), a novel by Francesco Mastriani 
 The Blind Woman of Sorrento (1916 film), a silent Italian film directed by Gustavo Serena
 The Blind Woman of Sorrento (1934 film), an Italian film directed by Nunzio Malasomma 
 The Blind Woman of Sorrento (1952 film), an Italian film directed by Giacomo Gentilomo